Umm al Ghaylam(أم الـغـيـلام) is a farming settlement in Qatar, located in the municipality of Ash Shamal. 

In Arabic, "umm" translates to mother and is used at the beginning of place names to describe an area with a particular quality. The second constituent, "ghaylam", is the name of a type of fish found in a well near the settlement.

References

Populated places in Al Shamal